Jan Matthysen is a former Belgian ambassador to the United States.

Life
Matthysen graduated from Ghent University in 1973 with a degree in Contemporary Political History. Having joined the Belgian Ministry of Foreign Affairs in 1984, he became First Secretary at the Belgian Embassy in Bonn, then Counselor at the Embassy in then East Berlin, a position which he held through the German reunification in 1990. He was a chargé d'affaires and later ambassador in Belgrade beginning in 1994. In 1997 he became Head of the NATO desk at the headquarters of the Foreign Ministry in Brussels. From 1999 to 2000, he was the Acting Head of the General Directorate for Political-Military Affairs and a senior advisor on Kosovo to the United Nations Secretary General's Special Representative for the Balkans.

In 2000, Matthysen moved to Ankara as ambassador to Turkey, Azerbaijan and Turkmenistan, and in 2004 he moved to Bangkok to become ambassador to Thailand, Cambodia, Laos and Burma.

Matthysen was appointed ambassador to the United States on 17 February 2009 and presented his credentials to United States President Barack Obama on 20 May 2009. He stayed until 31 December 2013. In 2014 he was appointed President of the Belgian National Security Authority, and on 4 November 2014, advisor of Princess Astrid of Belgium.

Matthysen and his wife Agnes Aerts have five children. Jan Matthysen's brother Hugo Matthysen is a Belgian singer, songwriter and television scenarist.

Offices held

References

External links
Embassy biography

Ambassadors of Belgium to the United States
Ambassadors of Belgium to Turkey
Ambassadors of Belgium to Azerbaijan
Ambassadors of Belgium to Turkmenistan
Ambassadors of Belgium to Thailand
Ambassadors of Belgium to Cambodia
Ambassadors of Belgium to Laos
Ambassadors of Belgium to Myanmar
Belgian diplomats
Living people
Ghent University alumni
Year of birth missing (living people)